Kirkton is a village in the Scottish Borders area of Scotland, off the A6088, near Hawick. Grid Ref. NT5413.

It is a former parish, amalgamated into the parish of Cavers in 1895.

Places nearby include Abbotrule, Bedrule, Bonchester Bridge, Denholm, Hallrule, Hobkirk, Wilton Dean and the Wauchope Forest.

See also
List of places in the Scottish Borders
List of places in Scotland

References

External links

RCAHMS record for Kirkton Schoolhouse
RCAHMS record for Axehead (Stone), Carved Stone Ball
Geograph image 508088: Border farmland near Kirkton

Villages in the Scottish Borders
Former civil parishes of Scotland